Regional football federations of Ukraine is associated members of Football Federation of Ukraine in regions of Ukraine.

In 2000, Football Federation of Ukraine created Council of Regions for the development of football in the regions throughout the country. It was dissolved in 2010.

Description 
There are 24 active members, while membership of other 3 association is suspended due to the 2014 Russian invasion of Ukraine. Each region conducts its own championship, while most of them has also the second and the third tiers of league competitions. Each region also conducts a regional cup competitions as well as some additional regional tournaments. Along with it each regional federation has several smaller regional federations of its own (raion and city federations). Note that the Sevastopol City Football Federation cooperates with the Crimean Republican Football Federation and often teams from Sevastopol compete in the championship of the peninsula.

Due to the 2014 Russian invasion of Ukraine, several regions were forced to suspend all sports competition due to war conditions. Republican Crimean Football Federation was raided and under the UEFA Special Commission mediation transferred to the Russian Football Union. Later it was renamed as Crimean Football Union. In 2016 Football Federation of Ukraine revived the Football Federation of Crimea in Kherson.

Football competitions in Luhansk Oblast were conducted under auspices of pro-Russian separatist administration (Luhansk People's Republic), while in Donetsk Oblast competitions were resumed under united championship of Donbas.

See also 
Football Federation of Ukraine
AAFU
Regional championships of Ukraine (football)

References

External links
Regional associations. Ukrainian Association of Football. 

Regional
+Regional
Ukrainian Association of Football